Leonard I. Zon, M.D., is the Grousbeck Professor of Pediatric Medicine at Harvard Medical School, Investigator at Howard Hughes Medical Institute, and Director of the Stem Cell Program, Children’s Hospital Boston.

He received a B.S. degree in chemistry and natural sciences from Muhlenberg College and an M.D. degree from Jefferson Medical College.  He subsequently did an internal medicine residency at New England Deaconess Hospital and a fellowship in medical oncology at Dana–Farber Cancer Institute. His postdoctoral research was in the laboratory of Stuart Orkin.

Research 
Dr. Leonard Zon is internationally recognized for his pioneering work in the fields of stem cell biology and cancer genetics.  He is founder and former president of the International Society for Stem Cell Research and chair of the Executive Committee of the Harvard Stem Cell Institute (HSCI).  He was the 2004-2005 President of the American Society for Clinical Investigation. In 2005, Dr. Zon was elected to the Institute of Medicine of the National Academies. In 2008, Dr. Zon was elected to the American Academy of Arts & Sciences. In 2022, Dr. Zon was elected to the National Academy of Sciences in recognition of his distinguished and continuing achievements in original research. He is also the recipient of the E. Donnall Thomas Prize, American Society of Hematology, 2010; Donald Metcalf Award, International Society for Experimental Hematology, 2013; and Alfred G. Knudson Award, National Cancer Institute, 2016; ISSCR Tobias Award Lecture, 2016; AACR-Irving Weinstein Foundation Distinguished Lecture Award, 2017; American Society of Hematology Mentor Award for Basic Science, 2019; and the Christiane Nüsslein-Volhard Award, European Zebrafish Society, 2022. 

Dr. Zon's laboratory uses the zebrafish as a model system for understanding vertebrate blood development. Zebrafish blood formation is similar to that of humans, and several mutants have disorders resembling human disease.  It is possible to evaluate in the zebrafish genetic pathways important for vertebrate hematopoiesis.  Dr. Zon also uses the zebrafish to study cancer.

References

Living people
Harvard Medical School faculty
American medical researchers
Howard Hughes Medical Investigators
Members of the National Academy of Medicine
Year of birth missing (living people)
Muhlenberg College alumni
Jefferson Medical College alumni